Kabuli Mehmed Pasha (1812 – 1877) was an Ottoman liberal politician and government minister.

References 

1812 births
1877 deaths
Politicians from Istanbul
Pashas
Turks from the Ottoman Empire
Government ministers of the Ottoman Empire